Red Cross of Cape Verde, abbreviated CVCV, was founded in 1984. It has its headquarters on Avenida Andrade Corvo in Praia, Cape Verde.

References

External links
Red Cross of Cape Verde

Cape Verde
Medical and health organizations based in Cape Verde
Organizations based in Praia
1984 establishments in Cape Verde
Organizations established in 1984